Khorramabad (also Romanized as Khorramābād and Khurramābād) is a village in Shahrabad Rural District, Shahrabad District, Bardaskan County, Razavi Khorasan Province, Iran. At the 2006 census, its population was 676, in 174 families.

References 

Populated places in Bardaskan County